Huseynaga Hadiyev (19 November 1946 — 12 January 1994) was an Azerbaijani singer popular in the 1970s and 1980s.

Biography 
Huseynaga Hadiyev was born in 1946 in Azerbaijan. His mother, Madam Tore, was the cousin of Jafar Jabbarly. Huseynaga started his musical career at the Pioneer House Accordion Club. With the assistance of Rizvan Elesgerov, he joined the Dan Ulduzu instrumental ensemble. In his final year of university, he got married. After finishing university he went to army. In January 1973, his son, Jeyhun, was born. Huseynaga heard this whilst in hospital, as he got sick in the army at that time.

According to his wife, Madam Sveta, he would not play a song that he didn't like. Geceler Bulaq Basi, Bu Gece and Menim Dunyam were his most well-known songs.

References

1946 births
1994 deaths
20th-century Azerbaijani male singers